Strike Me Pink is a 1936 American musical comedy film directed by Norman Taurog, starring Eddie Cantor and Ethel Merman, and produced by Samuel Goldwyn.

Cantor plays a nebbishy employee of an amusement park, forced to assert himself against a gang of slot-machine racketeers.  The climax involves a wild chase over a roller coaster and in a hot-air balloon, filmed at The Pike in Long Beach, California. The film's sets were designed by the art director Richard Day.

The film was Eddie Cantor's sixth of six films for Goldwyn, all produced and released within seven years.  The story derives from the novel Dreamland by the once-popular writer Clarence Budington Kelland, reworked as a 1933 stage musical comedy by Ray Henderson for Jimmy Durante.

Cast 
 Eddie Cantor as Eddie Pink
 Ethel Merman as Joyce Lennox
 Sally Eilers as Claribel Higg
 Parkyakarkus as Parkyakarkus
 William Frawley as Mr. Copple
 Helene Lowell as Hattie 'Ma' Carson
 Gordon Jones as Butch Carson
 Brian Donlevy as Vance
 Jack LaRue as Mr. Thrust
 Sunnie O'Dea as Sunnie
 Rita Rio as Mademoiselle Fifi
 Edward Brophy as Killer
 Sidney H. Fields as Chorley Lennox 
 Don Brodie as Mr. Marsh
 Charles McAvoy as Mr. Selby
 the Goldwyn Girls as Themselves

Critical reception
Writing for The Spectator in 1936, Graham Greene gave the film a good review, pointing out that in addition to the comedic value, the actorly qualities of Eddie Cantor made the film a true success. Although Greene suggests that Cantor is not perhaps quite at the level of Charlie Chaplin, he describes the scene between Pink and the gunman is "superb", and suggests that "one will have to wait a very long time for any film funnier than this one".

References

External links 

 
 Turner Classic Movies page

1936 films
American black-and-white films
Films directed by Norman Taurog
Samuel Goldwyn Productions films
1936 musical comedy films
American musical comedy films
1930s English-language films
1930s American films